The 430th Maryland General Assembly convened in a regular session on January 9, 2013, and adjourned sine die on April 8, 2013.

Senate

Party composition

Senate leadership

State senators

Notes
 This Senator was originally appointed to office by the Governor to fill an open seat.

 The President of the Senate does not serve on any of the four standing legislative committees. He does, however, serve on both the Executive Nominations and the Rules Committees.

House of Delegates

Party composition

House leadership

House membership

References

2013 in Maryland
Maryland legislative sessions